The Udzungwa five-toed skink (Leptosiaphos rhomboidalis) is a species of lizard in the family Scincidae. It is found in Tanzania.

References

Leptosiaphos
Reptiles described in 1989
Reptiles of Tanzania
Endemic fauna of Tanzania
Taxa named by Donald George Broadley